Abdelkader Mohamed Ghezzal (born 5 December 1984) is a former professional footballer who played as a forward or midfield playmaker. Born in France, he made 28 appearances for the Algeria national team scoring 3 goals.

Club career

Crotone
After starting his career with a number of minor league clubs in France, Ghezzal moved to Italy in 2005 to join Crotone. There, he managed to breakthrough to the higher level by scoring 20 goals in the Serie C1/B 2007–08 season, guiding his club to a Serie B promotion.

Siena
On 13 June 2008, Ghezzal signed with the Serie A side Genoa C.F.C., for €2 million. However, Ghezzal joined another Serie A squad A.C. Siena on 2 July 2008 for €3.5 million. It was part of the deal that Fernando Forestieri returned to Genoa for €4.5 million. Early in June Manuel Coppola joined Siena in co-ownership deal for €1.5 million.

Bari
On 1 July 2010, Ghezzal joined A.S. Bari, signing a four-year contract with the club, in co-ownership deal, for €2.25 million. Co-currently, Siena signed Pedro Kamatà and Filippo Carobbio also in co-ownership deal, for €500,000 each, made Ghezzal worth €1.25 million cash plus players.

In June 2011 Bari purchased Ghezzal outright for pre-agreed €2.25 million, again, it involved player swap. Kamatà and Carobbio joined Siena outright for pre-agreed price (€1 million in total), as well as Nicola Belmonte joined Siena outright after two-year loan in Bari for €1.25 million, thus the deal did not involve cash.

On 31 August 2011, Ghezzal joined A.C. Cesena on a season-long loan deal.

Parma
On 29 August 2013 he was signed by Parma F.C. for undisclosed fee, after refusing an offer from Kazakhstan. He was signed by Latina in temporary deal immediately.

International career
On 23 October 2008, in an interview with A.C. Siena's official website, Ghezzal indicated that he had spoken with Algeria head coach Rabah Saadane and that he was going to represent Algeria in international competition. Ghezzal had the opportunity to represent France, having been born there.

On 12 November 2008, Ghezzal was called up by Algeria manager Rabah Saadane for a friendly against Mali on 18 November 2008 in Rouen, France.

On 11 February 2009, Ghezzal scored his first goal for Algeria in a 2–1 win over Benin.

On 13 June, at the 2010 FIFA World Cup group stage, Ghezzal was brought on as a substitute in a match against Slovenia, but was subsequently sent off for two yellow card offences within thirteen minutes of being on the pitch.

Personal life
His younger brother, Rachid Ghezzal, is also a footballer and currently plays for Beşiktaş.

Career statistics

Club

International
Scores and results list Algeria's goal tally first, score column indicates score after each Ghezzal goal.

Notes

References

External links 
 

1984 births
Living people
People from Décines-Charpieu
French sportspeople of Algerian descent
Algerian footballers
Association football forwards
Algeria international footballers
2010 Africa Cup of Nations players
2010 FIFA World Cup players
Championnat National players
Serie A players
Serie B players
La Liga players
Olympique Lyonnais players
AS Saint-Priest players
F.C. Crotone players
A.S.D. La Biellese players
S.S.D. Pro Sesto players
A.C.N. Siena 1904 players
S.S.C. Bari players
A.C. Cesena players
Levante UD footballers
Parma Calcio 1913 players
Latina Calcio 1932 players
Como 1907 players
Ain Sud players
Algerian expatriate footballers
Algerian expatriate sportspeople in Italy
Expatriate footballers in Italy
Algerian expatriate sportspeople in Spain
Expatriate footballers in Spain
Sportspeople from Lyon Metropolis
French footballers
Footballers from Auvergne-Rhône-Alpes